The Torino Challenger is a professional tennis tournament played on indoor hard courts. It is currently part of the ATP Challenger Tour. It is held in Turin, Italy. It is organized by NEN Events.

Past finals

Singles

Doubles

References

ATP Challenger Tour
Hard court tennis tournaments
Tennis tournaments in Italy
Recurring sporting events established in 2022